Thirupalkadal Sreekrishna Temple (Thiruparkadal Sreekrishnaswamy Temple) is one of the oldest Hindu temples dedicated to the god Vishnu (Worshipped as Krishna), located in the village Keezhperoor, Thiruvananthapuram in Kerala, India. The central icon is a four-armed standing Vishnu carrying the conch Panchajanya (Turbinella pyrum), the discus Sudarshana Chakra, the mace Kaumodaki and a lotus with a holy basil garland. The principal deity, Krishna (Thirupalkadal Bhattarakar) was the family deity of Ay Family, who ruled over the place during the Sangam period. The kingdom and the family later came to be known as Venad Keezhperoor Swaroopam. In the early medieval Tamil literature canon of the Tamil Alvar saints (6th–9th centuries CE), the temple is one of the 108 principal Divya Desams ("Holy Abodes") in Vaishnavism, and is glorified in the Nalayira Divya Prabandham. The Nalayira Divya Prabandham glorifies this shrine as being among the 14 Divya Desam in Malai Nadu (corresponding to present-day Kerala and Kanyakumari). It is believed that Kulashekhara Alvar, considered the seventh in the line of the twelve Alvars, renovated this temple. The legends of this temple are closely intertwined with that of the empires and kingdoms that ruled Tamilakam and the state presently known as Kerala. The history of this temple is closely intertwined with the Chera and Chola Empires and the Kingdoms of Venad and Travancore. This Temple is located in the Keezhperoor village, Chirayinkeezhu Taluk, Thiruvananthapuram District, Kerala. This Temple is located in a peaceful and serene rustic countryside.

The temple is constructed in the ancient Dravidian style, with the presence of Brahma and Shiva in the outer wall of circular shaped garbhagriha, which represents the presence of Parabrahma. The roof of the sanctum sanctorum is formed by 36 rafters carved in 12 wooden pieces (of 30 degrees each), representing the 12 rashis which when multiplied by 3 (the number representing the Trimurti) equals 108 which is the number of pithas of Adi Parashakti. It is also believed that the Kollam Era started with the renovation of this temple.

History 
Thirupalkadal Sreekrishnaswamy temple is known as Adikulakovil of Ay kingdom. The temple was constructed by the Ay Kingdom (Kupaka), who were ruling the place with their capital at Keezhperoor during the sangam periode. This family was later known as Venad and then 'Thiruvadi' and 'Thiruvithamkur' which was finally corrupted into Travancore. According to Dr. M.G Sasibhooshan, a famous historian, the temple was constructed about 2000 years ago with a square shaped Sreekovil by Ay Dynasty's Keezhperoor Swaroopam. The temple was renovated in 9th century CE by the Venad King Vallabhan Kotha of Keezhperoor Illam.  The Keezhperoor Swaroopam was formed by the merger of the Chera dynasty based at Mahodayapuram with the Ays of Vizhinjam.

Administration 
During classical period the temple were administered by the Ay royal family of Keezhperoor illam.
In 12th century CE, 343 ME the temple administration was handed over to  a council consisting of Brahmins and Madambi Nairs in the ratio 8:2 by Sri Vira Udayamarttandavarman Tiruvadi, ilayaguru of Venad. He also fixed the expenditure of the temple in respect of the conduct of the daily bali-ceremony and other expenses connected with god's worship and yearly festival of the temple. The village of Kilimanoor with the forests, arable lands and compound sites included in it was granted by the King for the expenses connected with feeding of Brahmans and conducting local temple festivals. 3 para of paddy required for the daily expenses of the temple. 31 nali rice was given to temple servants as salary. The temple had 1 melsanthi, 2 kizhsanthis, and 12 servants including flower supplier, watchman, woman servant, and drummers. Total amount of 5 Achchu was collected from Melsanthi, Kizhsnthi, Variyan, Pallittayam as entrance fees and this amount was to be utilised for the purchase of or repairs to the temple utensils and other wastages without allowing  and  who superintended the temple affairs to utilise any portion of it for their own use. This expenditure had to be looked after by batches of two persons for each year. If the above expenses were not properly administered, the incumbents of the year will have to vacate their posts in the Uralma and that they should also settle any slight disputes or entanglements that they may occur with reference to the temple holdings or to the temple itself. The temple flourished till mid of 20th Century with its tremendous impact on the socio-cultural fields. Till 26/12/1965, Managing Trustee of the Thirupalkadal Devaswom was Brhmasree Narayanaru Narayanaru of Amunthuruthimadom (keezhcheri) one of the prominent Malayala Namboothiri illom situated at Attingal Near Manampoor Alamcode (Chirayinkeezh Taluk, Thiruvananthapuram District, Kerala State, India)(they are also the managing trustees of Thirumanampoor Subramanya Temple) belonging to Chenganoor Malayalam Namboothiri Brahmana Illom they are also the representative of his Highness Maharaja of erstwhile Travancore in Thiruvattar Adikesava Perumal Temple. In 1965, as per the court order, Brahmasree Narayana Narayanaru handed over the administration of the Temple to No.3200 Ambikavilasama Nair Service Society Karayogam of Keezhperoor

Post-Colonial period 
After the Independence, the leasing-subtenants became owners, it adversely affected the temple administration and the priest also stopped worship to deity. In 2012 his HighnessUthradom Thirunal Marthanda Varma visited the temple which revealed the relationship of Travancore Royal family with Thirupalkadal Sreekrishnaswamy Temple. Following this event an Ashtamangala Devaprasnam and Murajapam were conducted at the temple. In 2015 temple committee organised a 12-day pooja as specified in the Devaprasnavidhi in presence of Thantri Thekkedath Kuzhikkattillathu Vasudevan Bhattathirippadu. During the pooja Mooppil Swamiyar of Thrissur Thekke Madhom (Vasudevananda Brahmananda Bhoothi) visited temple and performed Pushpanjali.

Architecture 
The temple complex has granite walls enclosing it. Immediately on entering the eastern Nata, on either side a long granite foundation of the structure is visible. On the grounds to the front and right of the Deity and at an elevation, stood a Koothampalam, seemingly of modest measurements. There is an Anakkottil of impressive dimension stands in front of the temple. The principal Belikkallu is situated as usual, in front of the main entrance leading to the inner regions. The belikkapura has long fallen down. The detached pillars of Namaskara Mandapam has wooden pilasters on four sides, so also four stone pillars with two facing the sopanam carrying stone carvings. The square shaped copper tiled roof carries a crest spot on top. The inner ceiling is decorated with wooden houses. The granite sopanam leading to the inner areas connecting the sanctum rise from ground level to the front door in six steps. The balustrades on either side present a lion's head with a long rolled tongue. At the end of it there is a well executed carving of Shiva with Parvati sitting on his lap. It also contains a small Ganesha, Murugam  and a reclining Nandi. The balustrade on the opposite side offers the four-armed Vishnu holding the discus, conch, mace, and the lotus. Sreedevi is present on one side of him and Bhudevi on the other. The Sreekovil is circular, copper tiled and in procession of an inner encircling corridor. Mural paintings about Krishna leela used to adorn the walls.

References 

 Travancore Archaeological Series vol 1 to 7, 
 Rudrakshamala by Aswathi Thirunal Gowri Lakshmi Bayi published by TBS books , 9788130015477

External links 

Abhimana temples of Vishnu
Hindu temples in Thiruvananthapuram district
Krishna temples